Kaitlin Willoughby is a Canadian ice hockey forward, currently playing with the Calgary section of the PWHPA.

Career 
In high school, Willoughby played for the Prince Albert Bears in her hometown, where she served as team captain. After graduating, she moved to Saskatoon to attend the University of Saskatchewan. Across 132 USports games with the university, she scored 111 points. After scoring 25 points in 28 games in her rookie university season, she was named USports Rookie of the Year and was named to the 2013-14 Canada West All-Rookie Team. That year, she would also score the game-winning goal as the university won the Canada West conference championship for the first time in history. She would lead the team in scoring for three of the next four seasons and was twice named to the Canada West All-Star Team.

She was drafted 37th overall by the Calgary Inferno in the 2018 CWHL Draft. In her rookie CWHL season, she scored 6 points in 27 games, as the Inferno won the Clarkson Cup.

After the collapse of the CWHL in May 2019, she joined the PWHPA. She was awarded Goal of the Game at the Unifor Women's Hockey Showcase in September 2019, playing for Team Johnston as it lost to Team Jenner 4–3. She earned an assist the next day of the Showcase, as Team Johnston beat Team Knox 6–5 in shootouts. She played for Team Bellamy at the Secret Showcase in January 2020. She would stay with the organisation for the 2020–21 season, being named to the roster for the Calgary section.

International 
Willoughby was invited to the 2016 Hockey Canada's Women's Development Camp. She represented Canada at the 2017 and 2019 Winter Universiade, winning silver both times. She served as team captain in 2019.

Personal life 
She has a degree in nursing. Her sister, Morgan Willoughby, also played hockey at the University of Saskatchewan.

References

External links

1995 births
Living people
Calgary Inferno players
Clarkson Cup champions
Professional Women's Hockey Players Association players
Sportspeople from Prince Albert, Saskatchewan
University of Saskatchewan alumni
Universiade medalists in ice hockey
Universiade silver medalists for Canada
Competitors at the 2017 Winter Universiade